Cison di Valmarino is a village and comune with 2,613 inhabitants in the province of Treviso, Veneto, north-eastern Italy.

History

Prehistory

There is evidence that the area has been inhabited since prehistoric times from archaeological discoveries in Follina from the Paleolithic Mesolithic eras, to roof tiles and other fragments from the Bronze Age found in  Valmareno.

During the Roman period the Via Claudia Augusta a very important Roman road, which linked the valley of the Po River with Rhaetia (modern Austria) across the Alps, ran through this area.
 
The area became an important defensive position against barbarian invasions during the European Migration Period, with the fortress of CastelBrando being expanded and refortified.

The 15th-century Villa Casagrande is now the home of Contessa Ghislaine Brandolini d’Adda.

References

Cities and towns in Veneto